Turnabout may refer to:

In film and television:
 Turnabout (film), a 1940 comedy directed by Hal Roach, based on a novel by Thorne Smith (see below)
 Turnabout, a 2016 drama film directed by E.B. Hughes 
 Turnabout (game show), a 1990s BBC TV quiz programme
 Turnabout (TV series), a 1978–79 United States TV series

In other media:
 Turnabout (novel), a novel by Margaret Peterson Haddix
 Turnabout, a body swap novel by Thorne Smith
 Turnabout (comics), a one-page Disney comic by Carl Barks
 Turnabout (video game), a puzzle video game by Artdink
 Turnabout, a subsidiary record label of Vox Records

Places:
 Turnabout Glacier, Ellesmere Island, Nunavut, Canada
 Turnabout Lake, Qikiqtaaluk Region, Nunavut, Canada
 Turnabout River, Ellesmere Island, Nunavut, Canada
 Turnabout Theatre, a 1940–1950s venue in the city of Los Angeles

Other:
 Turnabout (boat), a small trainer sailboat for junior sailors
 Another name for Sadie Hawkins dance

See also 
 Turnaround (disambiguation)
 Turn Around (disambiguation)